From Where We Stand is the debut studio album by British modern country-pop music duo Ward Thomas. It was released in the United Kingdom on 20 July 2014 by WTW Music. The album includes the singles "Push for the Stride", "The Good & the Right", "Town Called Ugley" and "Guest List". The album peaked at number 41 on the UK Albums Chart.

Track listing

Weekly charts

Release history

References

2014 debut albums
Ward Thomas (band) albums